The Hackett Township was created on June 2, 1899 by the Government of Quebec. This forested township is located in the unorganized territory of Lac-Masketsi, in the Mekinac Regional County Municipality, in Mauricie, in Quebec, in Canada. The territory of this township is part of the watershed of Saint-Maurice River.

See also 

 MRC Mekinac Regional County Municipality
 List of township municipalities in Quebec
 Township Mekinac
 La Tuque
 Lake Hackett (Mékinac)

References

External links 
 City of Trois-Rives: 
 Regional County Municipality (RCM) Mekinac: 

Mékinac Regional County Municipality
Geography of Mauricie